Kurt Joseph Pellegrino (born May 7, 1979) is an American retired mixed martial artist. He competed in the lightweight division for Bellator Fighting Championships and Ultimate Fighting Championship.

Early life
Pellegrino wrestled for Point Pleasant Borough High School and placed second in the state in his junior and senior year. Pellegrino was a two-time wrestling state finalist.

Career
Pellegrino trained with Ricardo Almeida, a world-famous Brazilian Jiu Jitsu competitor at a Renzo Gracie affiliate school. He later trained with Kenny Florian's camp in Boston, Massachusetts, and at the Armory in Jupiter, Florida with Justin Haskins, Eduardo Guedes, and Raphael Chaves. He subsequently moved to New Jersey, where he opened Kurt Pellegrino's MMA School in Belmar, New Jersey in 2008.

Ultimate Fighting Championship
The Italian-American Pellegrino fought Alberto Crane at UFC Fight Night on January 23, 2008, who he defeated via second round TKO. The fight was notable as the only preliminary bout aired on the televised card. He received Fight of the Night award for this fight. Also, Pellegrino had a tooth knocked out early in the fight, which actually ripped a hole in his mouth, under his lip, and still went on to win, impressing fans and commentators alike.

Despite a strong first round, Pellegrino was defeated by TUF 5 winner Nate Diaz via triangle choke at UFC Fight Night 13 on April 2, 2008, in Broomfield, Colorado. As Diaz locked up the choke, he had time to flex for the crowd and throw up double middle fingers before Pellegrino submitted.

He defeated Thiago Tavares, in a preliminary bout at UFC 88: Breakthrough. Pellegrino bloodied Tavares' face in the first round and went on to win by a unanimous decision (29–28, 29–27, 29–27). There was a small controversy in the fight, as it appeared that Tavares submitted to an armbar in the second round, but the referee did not stop the bout, causing boos from the audience. The fight was awarded Fight of the Night honors and was voted by UFC as the #2 best fight of 2008.

Pellegrino next fought at UFC Fight Night 17 on February 7, 2009. He defeated Rob Emerson by submission due to a rear naked choke in the third round.

At UFC 101, Pellegrino defeated Josh Neer by unanimous decision (30–27, 30–27, 30–27). It was his first win on a UFC main card.

He was expected to face Frankie Edgar on December 5, 2009 at The Ultimate Fighter 10 Finale, but has been forced off the card due to an injury.

Pellegrino defeated Fabrício Camões at UFC 111 by rear naked choke earning him Submission of the Night.

Pellegrino's next fight was against Australian standout, George Sotiropoulos in which he lost by unanimous decision  at UFC 116 on July 3. Pellegrino tore his ACL and meniscus in the 1st round.  Two weeks after the fight he underwent two surgeries to repair his meniscus and to replace his ACL.

Pellegrino faced Gleison Tibau on March 19, 2011 at UFC 128 and lost via split decision.

On May 31, 2011, Pellegrino decided not to renew his contract with the UFC and to leave MMA for the time being.

Bellator Fighting Championships
Pellegrino made his return to MMA and by signing with Bellator Fighting Championships. He fought Patricky Freire at Bellator 59 on November 26 and lost via TKO in the first round.  During his post-fight interview, Pellegrino once again announced his retirement from MMA.

Pellegrino was expected to come out of retirement to face Marcin Held at Bellator 68 on May 11, 2012. However, Pellegrino was forced out of the bout due to injury.

He was then expected to face Saul Almeida at Bellator 108. However, Pellegrino was forced out of the bout due to injury once again, and Almeida was pulled from the card as a result.

Personal life
Pellegrino and his wife Tara have a daughter named Millie James Pellegrino. Pellegrino also has two other kids Priscilla Pellegrino and Kurt Jr. Pellegrino.

Accomplishments
Mixed Martial Arts
Ultimate Fighting Championship
Fight of the Night (One time)
Submission of the Night (Two time)
Reality Fighting
Reality Fighting Lightweight Championship (One time)
Amateur Wrestling:
New Jersey State Wrestling Finalist (Two time)

Mixed martial arts record

|-
| Loss
| align=center| 16–7
| Patricky Freire
| TKO (punches)
| Bellator 59
| 
| align=center| 1
| align=center| 0:50
| Atlantic City, New Jersey, United States
| 
|-
| Loss
| align=center| 16–6
| Gleison Tibau
| Decision (split)
| UFC 128
| 
| align=center| 3
| align=center| 5:00
| Newark, New Jersey, United States
| 
|-
| Loss
| align=center| 16–5
| George Sotiropoulos
| Decision (unanimous)
| UFC 116
| 
| align=center| 3
| align=center| 5:00
| Las Vegas, Nevada, United States
| 
|-
| Win
| align=center| 16–4
| Fabrício Camões
| Submission (rear-naked choke)
| UFC 111
| 
| align=center| 2
| align=center| 4:20
| Newark, New Jersey, United States
| 
|-
| Win
| align=center| 15–4
| Josh Neer
| Decision (unanimous)
| UFC 101
| 
| align=center| 3
| align=center| 5:00
| Philadelphia, Pennsylvania, United States
| 
|-
| Win
| align=center| 14–4
| Rob Emerson
| Submission (rear-naked choke)
| UFC Fight Night: Lauzon vs. Stephens
| 
| align=center| 2
| align=center| 3:14
| Tampa, Florida, United States
| 
|-
| Win
| align=center| 13–4
| Thiago Tavares
| Decision (unanimous)
| UFC 88
| 
| align=center| 3
| align=center| 5:00
| Atlanta, Georgia, United States
| 
|-
| Loss
| align=center| 12–4
| Nate Diaz
| Submission (triangle choke)
| UFC Fight Night: Florian vs. Lauzon
| 
| align=center| 2
| align=center| 3:06
| Broomfield, Colorado, United States
| 
|-
| Win
| align=center| 12–3
| Alberto Crane
| TKO (punches)
| UFC Fight Night: Swick vs. Burkman
| 
| align=center| 2
| align=center| 1:55
| Las Vegas, Nevada, United States
| 
|-
| Loss
| align=center| 11–3
| Joe Stevenson
| Decision (unanimous)
| UFC 74
| 
| align=center| 3
| align=center| 5:00
| Las Vegas, Nevada, United States
| 
|-
| Win
| align=center| 11–2
| Nate Mohr
| Submission (achilles lock)
| UFC Fight Night: Stevenson vs. Guillard
| 
| align=center| 1
| align=center| 2:58
| Las Vegas, Nevada, United States
| 
|-
| Win
| align=center| 10–2
| Junior Assunção
| Submission (rear-naked choke)
| UFC 64: Unstoppable
| 
| align=center| 1
| align=center| 2:04
| Las Vegas, Nevada, United States
| 
|-
| Win
| align=center| 9–2
| Jesse Chilton
| Submission (guillotine choke)
| Absolute Fighting Championships 18
| 
| align=center| 1
| align=center| 3:35
| Boca Raton, Florida, United States
| 
|-
| Loss
| align=center| 8–2
| Drew Fickett
| Submission (rear-naked choke)
| UFC 61: Bitter Rivals
| 
| align=center| 3
| align=center| 1:20
| Las Vegas, Nevada, United States
| 
|-
| Win
| align=center| 8–1
| Vadim Kulchitskiy
| Submission (guillotine choke)
| Reality Fighting 11
| 
| align=center| 1
| align=center| N/A
| Atlantic City, New Jersey, United States
| 
|-
| Win
| align=center| 7–1
| Kazuki Okubo
| TKO (doctor stoppage)
| Euphoria: USA vs. Japan
| 
| align=center| 1
| align=center| 0:38
| Atlantic City, New Jersey, United States
| 
|-
| Win
| align=center| 6–1
| Steve Kinnison
| Submission (rear naked choke)
| Freestyle Combat Challenge 20
| 
| align=center| N/A
| align=center| N/A
| Racine, Wisconsin, United States
| 
|-
| Win
| align=center| 5–1
| Sergey Golyaev
| Submission (arm-triangle choke)
| Euphoria: USA vs. Russia
| 
| align=center| 1
| align=center| 3:24
| Atlantic City, New Jersey, United States
| 
|-
| Win
| align=center| 4–1
| Jay R. Palmer
| Submission (rear-naked choke)
| Ring of Combat 7
| 
| align=center| 1
| align=center| 3:16
| Elizabeth, New Jersey, United States
| 
|-
| Loss
| align=center| 3–1
| Satoru Kitaoka
| Submission (guillotine choke)
| Pancrase: 2004 Neo-Blood Tournament Semifinals
| 
| align=center| 2
| align=center| 0:34
| Tokyo, Japan
| 
|-
| Win
| align=center| 3–0
| Muhsin Corbbrey
| Decision (unanimous)
| Reality Fighting 6
| 
| align=center| 3
| align=center| 5:00
| Wildwood, New Jersey, United States
| 
|-
| Win
| align=center| 2–0
| Jay Isip
| Submission (armbar)
| Reality Fighting 5
| 
| align=center| 1
| align=center| 3:38
| Atlantic City, New Jersey, United States
| 
|-
| Win
| align=center| 1–0
| Mac Danzig
| Decision (unanimous)
| WEC 4
| 
| align=center| 3
| align=center| 5:00
| Uncasville, Connecticut, United States
|

See also
 List of Bellator MMA alumni

References

External links
 Kurt Pellegrino Official Website
 
 

American male mixed martial artists
Lightweight mixed martial artists
Mixed martial artists utilizing wrestling
Mixed martial artists utilizing Brazilian jiu-jitsu
Living people
1979 births
American practitioners of Brazilian jiu-jitsu
People awarded a black belt in Brazilian jiu-jitsu
Mixed martial artists from New Jersey
American people of Italian descent
Point Pleasant Borough High School alumni
Sportspeople from Point Pleasant, New Jersey
Ultimate Fighting Championship male fighters
American male sport wrestlers